Lucas Sirkar, SDB (24 September 1936 – 18 April 2021) was an Indian Roman Catholic archbishop, He served as the archbishop of the Roman Catholic Archdiocese of Calcutta. He was succeeded by Thomas D'Souza, the current serving Archbishop of Calcutta.

He was ordained as a priest on 20 April 1968 and was a member of the religious institute, the Salesians of Don Bosco.

On 22 June 1984 he was appointed and on 22 September 1984 was consecrated as a Diocesan Bishop of Krishnagar. On 14 April 2000, he was appointed Coadjutor Archbishop of Calcutta. After the retirement of Henry Sebastian D'Souza, he succeeded him on 2 April 2002 as Archbishop of Calcutta. On 23 February 2012, Pope Benedict XVI accepted the resignation request made by Lucas Sirkar citing advanced age.

Most Rev. Lucas Sirkar SDB, Archbishop Emeritus of Archdiocese of Kolkata, died at 1.00 pm (IST) on Sunday, 18 April 2021 at Aradhana Mandir, Krishnanagar due to cardiac arrest. He was 84.

References 

21st-century Roman Catholic archbishops in India
1936 births
2021 deaths